The Greater Ville is a neighborhood of St. Louis, Missouri.  The area is bounded by Marcus Avenue on the northwest, Natural Bridge Avenue on the northeast, Dr. Martin Luther King Drive and St. Louis Avenue on the south via North Taylor Avenue and Sarah Street, and North Vandeventer Avenue on the southeast. The Greater Ville surrounds The Ville neighborhood.

Demographics

In 2020 Greater Ville's racial makeup was 95.2% Black, 1.3% White, 0.2% Native American, 2.5% Two or More Races, and 0.8% Some Other Race. 1.1% of the people were of Hispanic or Latino origin.

In 2010 Greater Ville's racial makeup was 97.4% Black, 0.7% White, 0.2% Native American, 1.4% Two or More Races, and 0.2% Some Other Race. 0.7% of the population was of Hispanic or Latino origin.

References

Neighborhoods in St. Louis